Vaqueros Fútbol Club is a football club that plays in the Tercera División de México. The club is based in Guadalajara, Jalisco, Mexico. In Guadalajara, Jalisco. On December 15, 2003, Mr. Antonio Ibarra Lopez and Mr. Vincent Spread, launched a project to train a new generation of professional soccer players. The project was innovative not only for his mechanics to make the player, but by the situation they were in youth (precarious situations and in some cases critical). This program is characterized by the praise and acceptance not only of parents, also from the players and coaches from the 1st. Professional Division, to cope with the great responsibility we have with the community. Therefore, sports promoter was formed Ixtlan Cowboys, SA de CV which was registered with the S.H.C.P. on April 30, 2004. The Cowboys Sports Promoter Ixtlan, whatever with physical or mental health programs and family that encourage comprehensive improvement Footballer and their families.

See also
Football in Mexico

References
Official Site o  (in Spanish)

Football clubs in Guadalajara, Jalisco
2004 establishments in Mexico
Association football clubs established in 2004